The 2019–20 Danish 2nd Divisions will be divided in two groups of twelve teams in the autumn. In spring there will be a promotion play-off and a relegation play-off. The top team of the promotion play-off group will be promoted to the 2020–21 Danish 1st Division.

Due to the COVID-19 pandemic the two divisions were ended after 17 games, and the clubs began a shortened promotion and relegation play-off on 13 June. The number of relegation spots were reduced to two.

Participants

Group 1

League table

Results

Group 2

League table

Results

Promotion Group
The top 6 teams from each group will compete for 1 spot in the 2020–21 Danish 1st Division.

Relegation Group
The bottom 6 teams from each group will compete to avoid the 2 relegations spots to the Denmark Series.

References

3
Danish 2nd Divisions
Danish 2nd Division seasons